Ferry railway station was a railway station in Newton-in-the-Isle, Cambridgeshire. It was on the Midland and Great Northern Joint Railway between Sutton Bridge and Wisbech. Its location was fairly rural, and a large amount of its traffic would have been farm goods. The line it stood on closed in 1959.

References

External links
 Ferry station on navigable 1946 O.S. map

Disused railway stations in Cambridgeshire
Former Midland and Great Northern Joint Railway stations
Railway stations in Great Britain opened in 1866
Railway stations in Great Britain closed in 1959
1866 establishments in England
1959 disestablishments in England
Fenland District